Eureka (Kutenai language: ʔa·knuk̓inʔis) is a town in Lincoln County, Montana, United States,  south of the Canada–US border. The population was 1,380 at the 2020 census. The town's mayor is LeeAnn Schermerhorn.

Geography
Eureka is located on the Tobacco River in an area known as the Tobacco Valley in the United States and as the Tobacco Plains in British Columbia to the north.

U.S. Route 93 passes through town. The Tobacco River flows through the western part of town.

History
Eureka was founded in the early 1880s as settlers moved north from Missoula and south from Canada and was originally known as Deweyville.  It was one of the last areas to be developed in Montana in frontier times, and logging was a major draw and source of income for decades. Eureka was once known as the "Christmas Tree Capital of the World," with evergreens shipped to many urban points for holiday sales.

The Canadian fur-trapper and explorer David Thompson visited the area in the early 19th Century during his searches for a route to the Pacific Ocean.  Early explorers, finding Indians there growing a native strain of tobacco, named it the Tobacco Plains. In the late 1970s, Eurekans began a "Tobacco Valley Rendezvous" every year in April to commemorate Thompson's visit.

President Harry S. Truman gave a speech in Eureka on October 1, 1952 as part of a whistle-stop tour in support of Adlai Stevenson's ultimately unsuccessful presidential campaign.

Eureka is home of Lincoln County High School and each August the Lincoln County Fair.

Actor John McIntire, who was reared in Eureka, and his wife, actress Jeanette Nolan, along with their son, actor-musician Tim McIntire, are interred at the Tobacco Valley Cemetery in Eureka.

Registered historic sites

Eureka has two listings on the National Register of Historic Places: the Eureka Community Hall and the Farmers and Merchants State Bank.

Stewart Rhodes lived in this city for years.

Climate
Eureka experiences a mild microclimate, notably warmer than the nearby cities of Kalispell and Whitefish, Montana as well as Invermere and Fernie, British Columbia. Summer afternoons are hot and sunny with low humidity while winters are often cloudy but lack the extreme temperatures found nearby.

Demographics

2010 census
As of the census of 2010, there were 1,037 people, 442 households, and 261 families living in the town. The racial makeup of the town was 94.8% White, 0.6% Native American, 0.4% Asian, 1.4% from other races, and 2.9% from two or more races. Hispanic or Latino of any race were 4.3% of the population.

There were 442 households, of which 28.5% had children under the age of 18 living with them, 43.0% were married couples living together, 10.4% had a female householder with no husband present, 5.7% had a male householder with no wife present, and 41.0% were non-families. 36.2% of all households were made up of individuals, and 18.7% had someone living alone who was 65 years of age or older. The average household size was 2.25 and the average family size was 2.92.

The median age in the town was 43.3 years. 23.9% of residents were under the age of 18; 6.3% were between the ages of 18 and 24; 21.7% were from 25 to 44; 25.2% were from 45 to 64; and 23.1% were 65 years of age or older. The gender makeup of the town was 45.4% male and 54.6% female.

2000 census
As of the census of 2000, there were 1,017 people, 431 households, and 252 families living in the town. The population density was 1,008.6 people per square mile (388.8/km2). There were 494 housing units at an average density of 489.9 per square mile (188.8/km2). The racial makeup of the town was 96.76% White, 1.28% Native American, 0.20% Asian, 0.59% from other races, and 1.18% from two or more races.  1.47% of the population were Hispanic or Latino of any race.

There were 431 households, out of which 30.2% had children under the age of 18 living with them, 43.9% were married couples living together, 11.1% had a female householder with no husband present, and 41.3% were non-families. 35.7% of all households were made up of individuals, and 14.6% had someone living alone who was 65 years of age or older. The average household size was 2.26 and the average family size was 2.93.

In the town, the population was spread out, with 24.5% under the age of 18, 7.8% from 18 to 24, 25.5% from 25 to 44, 24.1% from 45 to 64, and 18.2% who were 65 years of age or older. The median age was 40 years. For every 100 females there were 92.2 males.  For every 100 females age 18 and over, there were 88.7 males.

The median income for a household in the town was $27,120, and the median income for a family was $30,268. Males had a median income of $31,731 versus $18,214 for females. The per capita income for the town was $12,619. About 19.5% of families and 22.9% of the population were below the poverty line, including 33.5% of those under age 18 and 6.4% of those age 65 or over.

Media
KZXT 93.5 FM is a local station owned by Anderson Radio Broadcasting, Inc.

Infrastructure
Eureka Airport is a public use airport located 5 miles north of town.

Education
Eureka Public Schools educates students from kindergarten through 12th grade. They are known as the Lions. Lincoln County High School is a Class B high school (108-306 students) which helps determine athletic competitions.

Eureka has a public library, a branch of the Lincoln County Public Libraries.

Arts and culture

The Pacific Northwest National Scenic Trail passes through Eureka. The Tobacco Valley Community Center is located in Eureka.  Ten Lakes National Scenic Area is located approximately 45 minutes from town.

See also
 Empire Builder
 Eureka station
 Flathead Tunnel

References

External links

 
 Eureka, Montana, Lincoln County Detention Center
 Tobacco Valley News
 Eureka Public Schools
 Eureka Business Directory and Travel Guide (archived copy)

Towns in Lincoln County, Montana